Dave Hingerty (born 1969) is an Irish drummer and photographer. He is the drummer of The Frames, after a break of almost 10 years, and has played with and recorded with a number of other acts including Josh Ritter, who he performed with on several albums.

Early life
Hingerty was born in Dublin. His mother Kay was a journalist with the Irish Examiner whilst his father was Professor of Biochemistry at University College Dublin and was a former Irish Rugby International. He studied psychology at University College Dublin. At UCD he met Colm Mac Con Iomaire, who he would later play in The Frames with.

Career
Hingerty joined with The Frames after their previous drummer left the band, meeting the band on Tour in France. He played on Dance with the Devil, Set List and For the Birds with the band. He left the band due to creative differences with Glen Hansard but remains friends with him and has played in Hansard's other band, The Swell Season.

Following The Frames, he played with Josh Ritter. playing on Hello Starling and The Animal Years.

He is also a photographer, with his photo exhibition on his life on tour exhibited by Duke Street Gallery in Dublin.

Discography
 Hello Starling - Josh Ritter
 'The Animal Years - Josh Ritter
 Live From Vicar Street - Josh Ritter
 Set List - The Frames (Meteor Award)
 Dance The Devil - The Frames
 For the Birds - The Frames

References

Living people
1969 births
Irish drummers
Male drummers
People educated at C.B.C. Monkstown